David Lord (12 June 1929 – 11 December 1998) was a South African rower. He competed in the men's coxless four event at the 1960 Summer Olympics.

References

1929 births
1998 deaths
South African male rowers
Olympic rowers of South Africa
Rowers at the 1960 Summer Olympics
Sportspeople from Pretoria
20th-century South African people